The 2015–16 Richmond Spiders men's basketball team represented the University of Richmond during the 2015–16 NCAA Division I men's basketball season. Richmond competed as a member of the Atlantic 10 Conference under 11th-year head coach Chris Mooney and played its home games at the Robins Center. They finished the season 16–16, 7–11 in A-10 play to finish in ninth place. They defeated Fordham in the second round of the A-10 tournament to advance to the quarterfinals where they lost to Dayton.

Previous season
The Spiders finished the 2014–15 season 21–14, 12–6 in A-10 play to finish in a tie for fourth place. They lost in the quarterfinals of the A-10 tournament to VCU. They were invited to the National Invitation Tournament where they defeated St. Francis Brooklyn in the first round and Arizona State in the second round to advance to the quarterfinals where they lost to Miami (FL).

Departures

Recruiting

Roster

Schedule

|-
!colspan=9 style="background:#000066; color:#FFFFFF;"| Non-conference regular season

|-
!colspan=9 style="background:#000066; color:#FFFFFF;"| Atlantic 10 regular season

|-
!colspan=9 style="background:#000066; color:#FFFFFF;"| Atlantic 10 tournament

Source:

References

Richmond Spiders men's basketball seasons
Richmond
Richmond Spiders men's basketball
Richmond
Spiders basketball, men
Spiders basketball, men